Exilia cortezi is a species of sea snail, a marine gastropod mollusk in the family Ptychatractidae.

Description

Distribution
This marine species was found off San Diego, Point Loma, California, United States, North Pacific Ocean.

References

Ptychatractidae
Gastropods described in 1908